Damdamia, also spelled Damdamia, is a village in Cox's Bazar, Bangladesh. It is part of Teknaf Upazila and is located next to the Jadipara.

References 

Populated places in Chittagong Division